The Swedish Trotting Criterium (Swedish: Svenskt Travkriterium or only Kriteriet) is an annual national Group One harness event for trotters that is held at Solvalla in Stockholm, Sweden. It is considered one of the classic trotting events in Sweden as well as the most prestigious Swedish event for 3-year-old trotters.
The purse in the 2008 final was ≈US$458,000 (SEK 3,200,000), of which the winner Maharajah won half.

Location
The Swedish Trotting Criterium has been exclusively held at Solvalla since 1966. The first five editions was raced at Jägersro, before the hostesship was altered between Solvalla and Jägersro until 1954, when Åby was added to the mix. The three tracks took turns until 1966, just as with the Swedish Trotting Derby, another prestigious Swedish event. In 1966, Solvalla started to host the Criterium annually and Jägersro became permanent host track of the Derby.

 1927 - 1931 Jägersro
 1932 - 1954 Solvalla or Jägersro
 1954 - 1965 Åby, Solvalla or Jägersro
 1966 -      Solvalla

Entering the event
To enter the Swedish Trotting Criterium, a horse owner is obliged to make four payments of totally ≈US$530 (SEK4,125) as of 2009. These payments are as well valid for the Swedish Trotting Oaks, which is held at the same day as the Criterium but are open only for fillies. In addition to these costs, a supplementary fee of ≈US$820 (SEK6,360) is paid to enter the elimination races before the final. If a filly owner decides to enter the Oaks instead of the Criterium, the supplementary fee is half as large, ≈US$410 (SEK3,180).

Racing conditions

Distance
From the start in 1927 until 1977, the distance of the Criterium was 2,600 meters (1.62 miles). In 1978, an added 40 meters made up a distance of 2,640 meters (1.64 miles), which has been the distance of the race ever since.

Starting method
The first 33 Criterium finals was started by using volt start. In 1960, auto start was introduced. Since then, a motorized starting gate has been used every year, with exceptions for 1967, 1971 and 1979.

Past winners

Drivers with most wins
 8 - Gunnar Nordin
 8 - Sören Nordin
 5 - Stig H. Johansson 
 5 - Örjan Kihlström
 4 - Gösta Nordin
 3 - Håkan Wallner
 3 - Robert Bergh

Trainers with most wins
 8 - Gunnar Nordin
 8 - Sören Nordin
 5 - Stig H. Johansson
 4 - Gösta Nordin
 4 - Olle Goop
 3 - Håkan Wallner
 3 - Robert Bergh
 3 - Stefan Hultman

Sires with at least two winning offsprings
 3 - Quick Pay (Ex Hammering, Lass Quick, Lucky Po)
 2 - Allen Hanover (Allen Victory, Ina Scot)
 2 - Bulwark (Sir Basil, J'accuse)
 2 - Dreamer Boy (Ibrahim Pascha, Karina S.)
 2 - Express Ride (Jaded, Sahara Dynamite)
 2 - Jaguar (Sang, Coccinelle)
 2 - Locomotive (Codex, Locomite)
 2 - Pershing (Mack the Knife, Personia)
 2 - Pluvier III (Oktan Sund, Pamir Brodde)
 2 - Rollo (Julienne, Gay Gal)
 2 - Sir Walter Scott (Walter Top, Löjtnant Scott)
 2 - Zoot Suit (Zoogin, From Above)

Mares with at least two winning offsprings
 2 - Lemomite (Lord Scotch, Lime Abbey)

Winning stallions that have also sired winners
 Active Bowler (1978), sire of Not So Bad (1989)

Winning mares that have also brood winners
 Lorry (1932), dam of Turf (1944)

Winner with lowest odds
 Winning odds: 1.16 - Julienne (1961)

Winner with highest odds
 Winning odds: 119.00 - Kerrim (1957)

Fastest winners

Auto start
 1:14.0 (km rate) - Maharajah (2008)

Volt start
 1:18.5 (km rate) - Pamir Brodde (1979)

All winners of the Swedish Trotting Criterium

See also
 List of Scandinavian harness horse races

References

Harness races in Sweden